Zhang Chunhui (born 13 March 1983) is a Chinese-born Hong Kong football coach and former player. He is currently the goalkeeping coach of Chinese Women's Super League club Meizhou Hakka.

Club career
He was selected in the Hong Kong Top Footballer (Best XI Squad) for 2006–07.

On 2 July 2018, it was reported that Zhang had joined Pegasus as a player-coach. He was released by the club on 5 November 2019 due to discipline issues.

International career
Zhang is eligible to represent Hong Kong for international competitions after living there for enough years. He was called up by new Hong Kong national football team head coach Lee Kin Wo into the training squad of the team for the first time on 22 May 2007 for a friendly match against Indonesia national football team.

He was selected into Hong Kong League XI for 2007 Lunar New Year Cup and played in the first round against the Jamaica Olympic Team.

Personal life
On 9 July 2008, he was sentenced to imprisonment for 8 months for the offense of inflicting grievous bodily harm upon another person. He injured a 17-year-old boy in Causeway Bay on 19 December 2007.

Career statistics
As of 23 August 2011

International career
As of 17 November 2009

References

External links

 Zhang Chunhui at HKFA

1983 births
Living people
Chinese footballers
Footballers from Guangzhou
Hong Kong footballers
Association football goalkeepers
Hong Kong Premier League players
Hong Kong Rangers FC players
TSW Pegasus FC players
South China AA players
Sun Hei SC players
Southern District FC players
Expatriate footballers in Hong Kong
Chinese expatriate sportspeople in Hong Kong
Chinese expatriate footballers
Hong Kong international footballers
Hong Kong League XI representative players